London Scottish Bank PLC was a British bank based in Manchester, specialising in subprime lending.

About 

London Scottish Bank was a specialist financial services company that had been established for over a century. They had a nationwide network of high street branches.

The Group employed over 2,000 staff and operated in a range of markets, specialising in the provision of subprime and low income borrower loans. These services included consumer and commercial lending, secured and unsecured broking, debt collection and factoring.

In February 2008, the company announced they were stopping all lending. In November 2008 the company entered administration.

Robinson Way, the Debt Collection arm of London Scottish Bank was subject to a management buy out in August 2009.

External links
London Scottish corporate site
Robinson Way corporate site

References

Bank failures
Defunct banks of the United Kingdom
Banks disestablished in 2008
Companies that have entered administration in the United Kingdom